Umm Anmar was a woman of the Banū Khuza'āh clan that met the Ṣaḥābah of Muḥammad. She bought the slave Khabbab ibn al-Aratt. She and her brother Siba'a ibn Abd al-Uzza tortured Khabbab. She married Zuhayr ibn Abd al-As'ad. By whom, she had a son Anmar.

References

Arab women
7th-century Arabs